Oscar Manuel Robles Arenas (born April 9, 1976) is a Mexican former professional baseball infielder who played in Major League Baseball (MLB) for the Los Angeles Dodgers and San Diego Padres. Currently he is the manager for the Generales de Durango of the Mexican League and the Algodoneros de Guasave of the Mexican Pacific League.

Career
He spent much of the 2000s as a third baseman for the Mexico City Red Devils (Diablos Rojos del México), and played briefly as an infielder for the Los Angeles Dodgers from May  through . He graduated from Montgomery High School in San Diego, where he had his jersey retired as a pitcher, and set a then-record for San Diego Section career hits (143). He was originally signed by Houston Astros scout Deron Rombach after being drafted in the third round of the June  free agent draft. After being signed, he used some of his bonus money to buy a scoreboard for his high school field. However, the Astros had no use for Robles, so they sent him back to the Mexican Baseball League (LMB), where he batted around .400, until he was called up by the Los Angeles Dodgers, where he played 110 games in the 2005 season. On February 2, Robles was released by the Dodgers and his contract was sold to the Diablos Rojos del México. He was soon picked up by the San Diego Padres and invited to spring training.

On April 29, the Phillies claimed Robles off waivers from the Padres and assigned him to their Triple-A Lehigh Valley IronPigs in Allentown, Pennsylvania.

Robles played from 2009-2013 with the Diablos Rojos del México, in 2014 with the Guerreros de Oaxaca, and with the Toros de Tijuana from 2015-2017. Following the 2017 season and after winning the Mexican League Championship with the Toros, he announced his retirement as a player. However, he accepted an offer to stay with the Toros organization as a hitting coach for the 2018 season. On August 6, 2018, Robles was promoted to manager of the team for the rest of the season.

In June 2021, Robles was announced as manager for the Tigres de Quintana Roo of the Mexican League. He led the team to a 32–33 record, and they qualified for the Wild Card as the 6th seed from the South division. However, they lost to the Diablos Rojos del México in the first round of the postseason. Robles was not brought back for the 2022 season. 

On December 9, 2021, Robles was announced as new manager for the Algodoneros de Unión Laguna of the Mexican League. He was fired on May 26, 2022, after starting the season with a 9–20 record.

On June 1, 2022, Robles was hired as the new manager for the Guerreros de Oaxaca of the Mexican League. He was not retained following the season. 

On December 20, 2022, Robles was announced as new manager for the Generales de Durango of the Mexican League.

References

External links

1976 births
Living people
Águilas de Mexicali players
Auburn Astros players
Baseball players from Baja California
Diablos Rojos del México players
Guerreros de Oaxaca players
Gulf Coast Astros players
Jackson Generals (Texas League) players
Kissimmee Cobras players
Las Vegas 51s players
Lehigh Valley IronPigs players
Los Angeles Dodgers players
Major League Baseball players from Mexico
Major League Baseball second basemen
Major League Baseball shortstops
Major League Baseball third basemen
Mayos de Navojoa players
Mexican expatriate baseball players in the United States
Mexican League baseball infielders
Mexican League baseball managers
New Orleans Zephyrs players
Sportspeople from Tijuana
Portland Beavers players
San Diego Padres players
Toros de Tijuana players
2009 World Baseball Classic players